August is the eighth month of the year.

August may also refer to:

People
August (name), including lists of people with the given name or surname

Culture

Film and television
August (1996 film), an adaptation of Anton Chekhov's play Uncle Vanya directed by and starring Anthony Hopkins
August (2008 film), starring Josh Hartnett and Naomie Harris
August (2011 film), starring Murray Bartlett
"August" (Fringe episode), a 2009 episode of the television series Fringe
August (Fringe character)
the title character of Dan August, a 1970-71 American television series
August Booth, a character in the American television series Once Upon a Time
August: Osage County (film), a 2013 film (based on the 2007 play) starring Meryl Streep, Dermot Mulroney and Julia Roberts

Literature and publications
"August", a poem by John Updike
August (Rossner novel), a 1983 novel by Judith Rossner
August (Woodward novel), a 2001 novel by Gerard Woodward
August: Osage County, a 2007 Pulitzer Prize-winning play by Tracy Letts

Music
 August (band), a Thai boy band
 The August, an American country rock band

Albums
 August (album), a 1986 album by Eric Clapton
 August, a 2005 album by Elevator (band)
 August, a 2019 album by Shannon Lay

Songs
 "August" (song), a 2020 song by Taylor Swift
 "August", by Love from the album Four Sail, 1969
 "August", by Avail from the album Over the James, 1998

Other uses
August (company), a Japanese video game company
August, California, a census-designated place in San Joaquin County, California, United States
August Home, a home automation company known for door locks

See also

Auguste (disambiguation)
Agosto (disambiguation)
Augustus (disambiguation)
Augusta (disambiguation)
 Augusts (given name)